Hee-kyung Seo (born 8 July 1986), also known as Seo Hee-kyung, is a former South Korean female professional golfer playing on the LPGA Tour and on LPGA of Korea Tour. She won the LPGA Tour Rookie of the Year award in 2011.

After winning three LPGA of Korea Tour major championships in 2009, Seo notched her first LPGA Tour triumph at the 2010 Kia Classic where she finished six shots ahead of Inbee Park.

Seo had a close call in the 2011 U.S. Women's Open when she led by two shots with two holes to play, but she missed a 4 footer for par on the 71st hole, while So Yeon Ryu birdied the 72nd hole, resulting in a playoff, which Ryu went on to win.

Seo also came close at the 2012 Kraft Nabisco Championship, where she led by three strokes at one point, but bogeys on the last four holes would result in her finishing two strokes back of winner Sun Young Yoo.

On 30 November 2013, she married Junghoon Philip Kook (born 1979), an executive officer at DWS Asset Management based in Seoul, and gave a birth to their first son, Dohyun Philip Kook on 15 August 2014, on the Independence Day of Korea. Since then, they had two more sons, Dohoon Francis (born 2016) and Doheon Michael (born 2018). Seo  officially retired from professional golf in November 2015 to spend more time with her family.

Professional wins

LPGA Tour (1)

LPGA Tour playoff record (0–4)

KLPGA Tour (11) 

Tournaments in bold denotes major championships on KLPGA Tour.
^ Co-sanctioned with the Ladies European Tour

Results in LPGA majors
Results not in chronological order before 2015.

CUT = missed the half-way cut
T = tied

Summary

Most consecutive cuts made – 9 (2009 U.S. Open – 2012 Kraft Nabisco)
Longest streak of top-10s – 1 (three times)

LPGA Tour career summary

 Seo was not a member of the LPGA Tour prior to 2011. Earnings and records for those years are not official.
 official as of the 2015 season

References

External links

Biography on seoulsisters.com
Hee-Kyung Seo bio and pictures

South Korean female golfers
LPGA of Korea Tour golfers
LPGA Tour golfers
Sportspeople from Gyeonggi Province
People from Suwon
1986 births
Living people